A fork in the road is a metaphor, based on a literal expression, for a deciding moment in life or history when a choice between presented options is required, and, once made, the choice cannot be reversed.

Examples
There is a common motif in Russian folk tales, where a vityaz (Russian knight) comes to a fork in the road and sees a menhir with an inscription that reads: "If you ride to the left, you will lose your horse, if you ride to the right, you will lose your head".
The phrase appears in the Book of Ezekiel (Ezekiel 21:19–23 NRSV).
"Mortal, mark out two roads for the sword of the king of Babylon to come; both of them shall issue from the same land.  And make a signpost, make it for a fork in the road leading to a city; mark out the road for the sword to come to Rabbah of the Ammonites or to Judah and to Jerusalem the fortified.  
A fork in the road is mused upon by Robert Frost in his poem "The Road Not Taken", which begins, "Two roads diverged in a yellow wood..."
Malapropist extraordinaire Yogi Berra's saying "When you come to a fork in the road, take it" made the title of his book When You Come to a Fork in the Road, Take It!: Inspiration and Wisdom From One of Baseball's Greatest Heroes. 
It is also depicted in the book Alice's Adventures in Wonderland where Alice came to a fork in the road and saw a cheshire cat in the tree. 
The album cover of A Nice Pair includes a literal depiction of a fork in the road, a visual pun on the expression..

See also
 Crossroads (culture)
 Fork in the road (disambiguation) (for other meanings of Fork in the road)
 Road junction 
 Point of no return

References

Metaphors referring to places